David Gvantseladze (28 March 1937 – 1 May 1984) was a Georgian wrestler. He won a bronze medal at the 1964 Summer Olympics and a silver medal at the 1963 World Wrestling Championships in Greco-Roman wrestling in the lightweight category (under 70 kg).

References

1937 births
1984 deaths
Sportspeople from Batumi
Olympic wrestlers of the Soviet Union
Wrestlers at the 1964 Summer Olympics
Male sport wrestlers from Georgia (country)
Olympic bronze medalists for the Soviet Union
Olympic medalists in wrestling
World Wrestling Championships medalists
Medalists at the 1964 Summer Olympics
Burevestnik (sports society) athletes